Parornix quadripunctella is a moth of the family Gracillariidae. It is known from Québec, Canada, and Georgia, Kansas, Kentucky, Maine, Maryland, Vermont and Pennsylvania in the United States.

The larvae feed on Amelanchier species (including Amelanchier canadensis), Cydonia oblonga, Malus species (including Malus sylvestris), Photinia pyrifolia, Prunus and Pyrus species. They mine the leaves of their host plant. The mine has the form of a tentiform mine in the leaves.

References 

Parornix
Moths of North America
Moths described in 1861